Berane Gymnasium, officially Panto Mališić Gymnasium is a high school in Montenegro. Situated near the center of Berane, it was founded on November 6, 1913 by government of Kingdom of Montenegro being the oldest high school in Polimlje area. In 2013, the school will celebrate 100 years since its official foundation. It is one of the schools in Montenegro to offer german language Kultusministerkonferenz certified examinations, which allows examinees to continue their academic studies in Germany.

Notable alumni
Mihailo Lalić, novelist
Radovan Zogović, poet
Miodrag Bulatović, novelist and playwright
Milovan Đilas, politician

References

External links
 

Education in Berane
Gymnasiums in Montenegro
Educational institutions established in 1913
1913 establishments in Montenegro
Schools in Berane